Yang Feng is a Chinese paralympic swimmer. He participated at the 2020 Summer Paralympics in the swimming competition, being awarded the silver medal in the men's 100 metres butterfly event on S8 class, scoring 1:03.20. Feng also participated at the 2012 Summer Paralympics in the swimming competition, winning no medal.

References

External links 
Paralympic Games profile

Living people
Place of birth missing (living people)
Year of birth missing (living people)
Chinese male butterfly swimmers
Swimmers at the 2012 Summer Paralympics
Swimmers at the 2020 Summer Paralympics
Medalists at the 2020 Summer Paralympics
Paralympic medalists in swimming
Paralympic swimmers of China
Paralympic silver medalists for China
S8-classified Paralympic swimmers
21st-century Chinese people